Uranothauma confusa is a butterfly in the family Lycaenidae. It is found in the Livingstone Mountains of Tanzania and in Malawi (the mountains in the south of the country, except Mount Mlanje).

References

Butterflies described in 1989
Uranothauma